Poshtir may refer to:
 Poshtir, Sowme'eh Sara
 Poshtir, Mirza Kuchek Janghli, Sowme'eh Sara County